Dicky Palyama (born March 26, 1978 in Gouda) is a male badminton player from the Netherlands.

Early career
After winning four junior titles in the Netherlands between 1994 and 1996, Dicky took the European junior U19 title in 1997.
His first success as a professional came in 1998, when he took the Welsh Open International title. 
In 2000 he took his first National Dutch Championship; he has since won a record nine individual singles Dutch Championship titles.
In 2002 he won the Spanish International Badminton Tournament and in 2003 the Bitburger Open International.

2007 European Cup
As a part of the BC Amersfoort team with Lotte Bruil-Jonathans, Yao Jie, Larisa Griga, Chris Bruil and Eric Pang, Palyama reached the final of the European Cup 2007 in Amersfoort by defeating CB Rinconada in the semi-finals. Unfortunately they fell to the NL Primorje team in the finals.

Later career
In 2008 Palyama won the Russian Open Grand Prix. 
In 2009 he won both the Dutch & Polish Open International Challenges. 
In 2010 he won the Strasbourg Masters.
Dicky Palyama retired as a professional badminton player in October 2013 with a special farewell demonstration match at the Yonex Dutch Open 2013 in front of a packed house at the Almere Topsport Centre against Peter Gade.

Major achievements
Men's singles

Personal life
Dicky Palyama married in 2009; he and his wife have two children. Dicky is currently a trainer/coach at the Regional Training Centre of Almere and an assistant coach of the Dutch National junior squad. Dicky Palyama was also head coach of Dutch premier division club The Flying Shuttle Barendrecht for a short period.

References
European results

External links
 
 

1978 births
Dutch male badminton players
Living people
Sportspeople from Gouda, South Holland
Dutch people of Indonesian descent